Kismat may refer to:
Kismet (disambiguation), word for "fate" or "destiny" and is an Arabic word as well as being used in Bengali, Hindi, Urdu, Nepali, Persian and Turkish, spelled "Kismat" in English in the Indian subcontinent
Kismat (TV series), an Indian drama television series
Kismat (Sonu Nigam album), 1998
Kismat (1968 film), a 1968 Indian Hindi film directed by Manmohan Desai
Kismat (1995 film), a 1995 Indian Bollywood film directed by Harmesh Malhotra
Kismat (2004 film), a Bollywood film directed by Guddu Dhanoa
Kismat Radio, a British radio station
Qismat, a 2018 Indian Punjabi-language film by Jagdeep Sidhu

See also
 Kismet (disambiguation)
 Kismath (disambiguation)